Köttgrottorna is a Swedish punk band which is sometime labeled as punk rock or just rock. They have been around for a long time and are mostly appreciated by fans of the Swedish punk scene, and ironically mostly hated by other fans of the Swedish punks cene.

Discography 
 1986 - Blodsdans
 1987 - Halvdöd
 1991 - Hungrig
 1993 - Sex, Politik & Fåglar
 1993 - Köttrea 1983-93 (compilation)
 1994 - Sanningens Morgon
 1997 - Tinnitus
 1999 - Soft Metal
 2005 - Far åt helvete (2CD)
 2005 - Vi snor om vi vill
 2006 - Drängen

Fun facts 
 Backyard Babies have opened up for Köttgrottorna

Members
Stefan "Mongo" Enger - Bass & vocals
Hans-Peter "Happy" Törnblom - drums
Janne Olsson - Guitar & backing vocals
Lars "Guld-Lars" Jonsson - Guitar

Tidigare medlemmar
Thomas "Valen" Wahlström - Vocals & Guitar 83-84
Jörgen Ohlsson - Vocals & Guitar 84-87

Swedish punk rock groups